Mohammad Shah Azahar bin Abdullah Ahar, formerly known as Philip Anak Ahar (born 11 December 1983) is a Bruneian international footballer of Iban descent who plays as a defender for Lun Bawang FC of the Brunei Super League.

Philip, as he was previously known, started playing club football with QAF FC of the B-League Premier 1 in the 2005–06 season as an employee of Ben Foods (B), a company under the QAF corporation. His club won the Bruneian league championship for three seasons in a row while he was there.

Shah Azahar joined Jerudong FC once QAF FC waived entry into the 2015 Brunei Super League, along with many of his QAF teammates. He moved again to Wijaya FC for the following 2016 season.

After several years off the pitch to focus on his running career, Shah Azahar rejoined Wijaya in June 2021.

International career
While still known as Philip Anak Ahar, he made his first foray into the international scene with Brunei at the 2006 AFC Challenge Cup held in Bangladesh. He made his debut and only appearance as a late substitute in the 2-1 win over Nepal on 4 April. His next tournament was the 2010 AFC Challenge Cup qualification in which he played two games out of three, all as substitute.

After solid displays with Jerudong FC, Shah Azahar was recalled into the international fold in mid-2015, taking the field in friendly games against Singapore and Cambodia.

Honours

Team
QAF FC
 Brunei Premier League (3): 2005–06, 2007–08, 2009–10
 Brunei League Cup (2): 2008, 2009

Personal life
Besides football, Shah Azahar is also a long-distance runner who has finished in first place at many locally-held events. Hailing from a family of runners, his eldest brother Sefli is a celebrated Bruneian marathon runner, while his elder brother Jimmy represented Brunei at the 2004 Summer Olympics for the men's 1500 metres on top of having played league football with MS PDB.

Shah Azahar embraced Islam and changed his name from Philip circa 2010.

External links

References 

1983 births
Living people
Iban people
Association football defenders
Bruneian footballers
Brunei international footballers
Wijaya FC players
Converts to Islam